Solanum chenopodioides, commonly known as the whitetip nightshade or velvety nightshade, is a shrub of the family Solanaceae native to South America. It has become naturalised in North America, Europe, Australia, and New Zealand.

References

External links 
 

chenopodioides
Flora naturalised in Australia
Plants described in 1794